The following is a list of Russell Howard & Mum episodes featuring British stand up Russell Howard and his mum. The series was commissioned in April 2016. The first episode was broadcast on Comedy Central on 19 October 2016. A second series began on 26 March 2018.

Episodes

Series 1 (2016)

Series 2 (2018)

Series 3 (2019)

Series 4 (2019)

See also
 Jack Whitehall: Travels with My Father
 Bradley Walsh and Son Breaking Dad

References

Lists of British comedy television series episodes
Lists of British non-fiction television series episodes